Konrad Grebe (7 June 1907 – 12 July 1972) was a German mining engineer and inventor.

Life 

He worked as a mining engineer in Ibbenbüren for German company Preussag. In 1937, Grebe invented the Kohlenhobel (coal plow). Grebe was married with Luise Grebe. He was buried at central cemetery in Ibbenbüren.

Awards 
 1943: Ehrenzeichen pioneer of labour
 1962: Rudolf-Diesel-Medaille

Literature 
 Hans Röhrs: Die Wiege des Kohlenhobels (with short biography of Konrad Grebes)
 Klaus Rotte: Kohlenhobel revolutionierte Bergbau: Konrad Grebe – Pionier der Arbeit. in: Ibbenbürener Volkszeitung, 30 December 1998

External links 
 Wilhelm Löbbe and Konrad Grebe (coal plow) to be inducted into the International Mining Technology Hall of Fame

References 

People from Neunkirchen (German district)
German mining engineers
German coal miners
20th-century German inventors
1907 births
1972 deaths
20th-century German engineers
Engineers from Saarland